Elytron or elytra may refer to:

Elytron, a modified hardened forewing in certain insect orders
Elytron (Annelida), ornamental scales on the dorsum of certain annelid families
Elytron (journal)